Adan may refer to:

People 
 Adan (given name)
 Adan (surname)

Places 
 'Adan or Aden, a city of Yemen
 'Adan Governorate, Yemen
 Al-Adan, a district of the governorate of Mubarak Al-Kabeer in Kuwait
 The Adan River, located in India
 Adan, Hooghly, village in West Bengal, India
 Aden_Protectorate Protectorate state of Britain from 1839 to 1960.

See also 
 Edain, a fictional race of humans in J. R. R. Tolkien's works
 Adan Ronquillo, a 1993 film by Joey del Rosario
 Windswept Adan, a 2020 album by Ichiko Aoba